The Old Medford High School is a historic high school building at 48–64 Forest Street in Medford, Massachusetts.  The building presently houses condominiums and a community theater.

It was built in 1894–1896 and added to the National Register of Historic Places in 1983.

In 1914, an addition was added to the building, nearly doubling it in size, due to the growth of Medford. In 1929 the north wing was constructed, followed by the south wing ten years later.  In 1984, the city sold the building to a property developer to convert it into condominiums.

See also
National Register of Historic Places listings in Medford, Massachusetts
National Register of Historic Places listings in Middlesex County, Massachusetts

References

External links
 Old Medford High School Website

School buildings on the National Register of Historic Places in Massachusetts
School buildings completed in 1896
Buildings and structures in Medford, Massachusetts
National Register of Historic Places in Medford, Massachusetts
Hartwell and Richardson buildings